Paola Lázaro (/pao-lah/ born October 24, 1987) is a Puerto Rican actress, writer, and playwright. She is best known for portraying Juanita "Princess" Sanchez on the apocalyptic drama television series The Walking Dead (2020-2022).

Early life
Lázaro was born and raised in San Juan, Puerto Rico. Lázaro later left to study at the State University of New York at Purchase. In 2009, she graduated as a Bachelor of Fine Arts with a degree in dramatic writing. Lázaro completed her Master's Degree in playwriting from Columbia University in 2013. At the end of her final year at Columbia, she was mentored by playwright Stephen Adly Guirgis over the course of the production of her thesis play. Over the years the two have become very close, and Guirgis finds her to be a “kindred spirit,” often referring to Lázaro as his best friend. His presence has heavily influenced both her writing and her career. Following her thesis production with Guirgis, Lázaro also participated in the Emerging Young Writer's Group at the Public Theatre, worked on a summer program with Labyrinth Theatre Company, and received an Arts Entertainment Scholarship Award from the National Hispanic Foundation for the Arts.

Career
After earning her M.F.A., Lázaro was asked to join Atlantic Theatre Company in New York City, as playwright-in-residence for the 2016–2017 season. This selective playwright-in-residency program was created by the Tow Foundation and provides funds to New York City theatre companies to support a playwright's production of a new work, and focused on Lázaro's new play, Tell Hector I Miss Him (2017). The play dramatizes a cast of eccentric characters in Old San Juan, Puerto Rico, coping with love, addiction, and fear. The Atlantic Theatre Company's production, directed by David Mendizabal, opened January 11, 2017 and was scheduled to close January 23; the run was extended due to popular demand. One reviewer described the play as “Our Town with salsa and cocaine.” Though Lázaro grew up in a neighborhood very different from her characters, she said the play has “a lot of me in it” and parallels her own past experiences with love. Lázaro hopes the play will offer universal themes and characters for Latinos, while also representing the humanity in her characters. As she asks, “where is the love in macho culture, in tradition?”

While Lázaro is dedicated to relating to Latinos everywhere through her playwriting, she has a background as an actress as well. Under the direction of Lisa Peterson, Lázaro performed in Cherry Lane Theatre's recent production of Lisa Ramirez's To the Bone, a play based on interviews Ramirez conducted with Latina immigrant poultry workers. Lázaro played Lupe, daughter of Olga (played by Ramirez), a hip-hopping, skateboarding student of political science and law. Her work on this production is described as played with “vivacious urgency,” and it earned her a Drama Desk Award nomination for Outstanding Featured Actress in a Play. In 2017 she was acting in film, playing a sex worker in a drama called Pimp and an undercover officer in the film Scenes from the Underground.

Lázaro is a firm believer that Latinos must “write our own stories and create work for ourselves.”

In 2020, Lázaro was cast as Juanita "Princess" Sanchez on AMC's The Walking Dead.

Personal life

Lázaro identifies as pansexual.

Filmography

Film

Television

References

External links

Living people
People from San Juan, Puerto Rico
Puerto Rican dramatists and playwrights
1994 births
Hispanic and Latino American actresses
LGBT Hispanic and Latino American people
Pansexual actresses